Port de la Robine is located at PK168 on the Canal du Midi immediately adjacent to the Truilhas Bridge.

There is room for 80 boats.  Facilities include parking, sanitation, fuel, and security.  Map

References

Gallery

Canal du Midi